We Got Divorced is a South Korean reality television show that airs on TV Chosun.

Season 1 began on November 20, 2020, and ended on February 15, 2021 at 13 episodes, and the show is expected to return for Season 2 by fall 2021. Season 2 aired on Fridays starting April 8, 2022 and ended on July 1, 2022.

Airtime

Overview
It is a "real time drama" reality show that features divorced celebrity couples reuniting through the show, and they spend some time together by themselves.

Cast

Studio

Hosts
 Shin Dong-yup (Season 1-2)
 Kim Won-hee (Season 1-2)

Guests
Season 1
 Kim Sae-rom (Episode 2-13)
  (Episode 1-4)
 Jeong Ga-eun (Episode 1)
 Jang Su-won (Sechs Kies) (Episode 5-6)

Season 2
 Kim Sae-rom
 Choi Gogi (Episode 3)
 Yoo Ggaenip (Episode 3)

Divorced Couples

Season 1
 Lee Young-ha – Sunwoo Eun-sook (Episode 1-13)
 Married from 1981 to 2007
 Choi Gogi – Yoo Ggaenip (Episode 1-13)
 Married from 2016 to 2020
  –  (Season 1 Episode 3-9)
 Married from 2007 to 2015
  (DJ DOC) – Park Yoo-sun (Episode 6-13)
 Married from 2018 to 2020
 Park Se-hyeok – Kim Yu-min (Episode 10-13)
 Married from 2018 to 2019
 Kim Dong-sung – In Min-jeong (Episode 11)
 Kim was married from 2004 to 2018
 In is Kim's current girlfriend; she was also divorced in 2014

Season 2
 Eli Kim –  (Episode 1-12)
 Married from 2014 to 2020
  –  (Episode 1-12)
 Married from 1989 to 1998, and re-married from 2002 to 2015
  –  (Episode 5-12)
 Married from 2000 to 2020

Aftermath
On June 2, 2021, it was confirmed by Choi Gogi, one of the participating cast of the show, that he is currently dating one of the writers of the show. The same year on August 12, Choi confirmed through his Instagram update that they have broken up.

Ratings

Season 1

Notes

Notes

References

2020 South Korean television series debuts
2021 South Korean television series endings
South Korean reality television series